Wu Cheng-chung may refer to:

John Baptist Wu (1925–2002), Chinese-born Roman Catholic prelate
Wu Tsung-tsong (born 1955), Taiwanese politician